"Paradise" is a song by American singer Bazzi, released as a single on April 4, 2019. The music video was released the same day. The song reached the top 50 in Australia and the top 40 in Norway. It is the lead single from his debut mixtape Soul Searching.

Critical reception
Chloe Gilke of Uproxx called the song a "pop anthem" and "blissfully romantic". Madeline Roth of MTV said "Paradise" is a "fittingly euphoric anthem in the vein of his previous hits 'Mine' and 'Beautiful'".

Music video
The music video was released on April 5, 2019. Shot in Mexico City and directed by Bon Duke, it features Bazzi singing as "couples of all genders and orientations lock lips in a dark room".

Charts

Certifications

References

2019 singles
2019 songs
Bazzi (singer) songs
Songs written by Bazzi (singer)
Atlantic Records singles